The game of cricket has inspired much poetry, most of which romanticises the sport and its culture.

Poems

Cricket: An Heroic Poem
Hail, cricket| Glorious, manly, British Game!
First of all Sports! be first alike in Fame.

The poem by James Love is too long to quote in full; above are its opening two lines. It describes a match in 1744 between Kent and England. It is written in rhyming couplets. According to H.S. Altham, it "should be in every cricket lover's library" and "his description of the game goes with a rare swing". The poem is the first substantial piece of literature about cricket.

At Lord's
Poet: Francis Thompson
 It is little I repair to the matches of the Southron folk,
 Though my own red roses there may blow;
 It is little I repair to the matches of the Southron folk,
 Though the red roses crest the caps, I know.
 For the field is full of shades as I near a shadowy coast,
 And a ghostly batsman plays to the bowling of a ghost,
 And I look through my tears on a soundless-clapping host
 As the run stealers flicker to and fro,
 To and fro:
 O my Hornby and my Barlow long ago!

 It's Glo'ster coming North, the irresistible,
 The Shire of the Graces, long ago!
 It's Gloucestershire up North, the irresistible,
 And new-risen Lancashire the foe!
 A Shire so young that has scarce impressed its traces,
 Ah, how shall it stand before all-resistless Graces ?
 O, little red rose, their bats are as maces
 To beat thee down, this summer long ago!

 This day of seventy-eight they are come up north against thee
 This day of seventy-eight long ago!
 The champion of the centuries, he cometh up against thee,
 With his brethren, every one a famous foe!
 The long-whiskered Doctor, that laugheth the rules to scorn,
 While the bowler, pitched against him, bans the day he was born;
 And G.F. with his science makes the fairest length forlorn;
 They are come from the West to work thee woe!

 It is little I repair to the matches of the Southron folk,
 Though my own red roses there may blow;
 It is little I repair to the matches of the Southron folk,
 Though the red roses crest the caps, I know.
 For the field is full of shades as I near a shadowy coast,
 And a ghostly batsman plays to the bowling of a ghost,
 And I look through my tears on a soundless-clapping host
 As the run stealers flicker to and fro,
 To and fro:
 O my Hornby and my Barlow long ago!

Not long before his death and long after he had watched Hornby and Barlow bat at Old Trafford, Thompson was invited to watch Lancashire play Middlesex at Lord's. As the day of the match grew closer, Thompson became increasingly nostalgic. At the end, he did not go for the match, but sat at home and wrote At Lord's. The original match in 1878 ended in a draw, with Gloucestershire needing 111 to win with five wickets in hand, Grace 58*.

The first stanza of the poem has contributed the titles of at least three books on cricket:
 G. D. Martineau's The field is full of shades
 Eric Midwinter's history of Lancashire cricket Red roses crest the caps
 R. H. Young's Field Full of Shades. A personal history of Claverham (Yatton) Cricket Club.

The first stanza is also quoted in full by Count Bronowsky in Paul Scott's Raj Quartet novel The Day of the Scorpion.

Punch on William Scotton
The satirical magazine Punch printed the following poem following a particularly slow and boring innings by William Scotton. It mimicked Tennyson's "Break, break, break".

Block, block, block
At the foot of thy wicket, O Scotton!
And I would that my tongue would utter
My boredom. You won't put the pot on!
Oh, nice for the bowler, my boy,
That each ball like a barndoor you play!
Oh, nice for yourself, I suppose,
That you stick at the wicket all day!

And the clock's slow hands go on,
And you still keep up your sticks; 
But oh! for the lift of a smiting hand,
And the sound of a swipe for six!
Block, block, block,
At the foot of thy wicket, ah do!
But one hour of Grace or Walter Read
Were worth a week of you!

Alfred Mynn
When Alfred Mynn died in 1861, William Jeffrey Prowse penned a poem in his memory. The first six stanzas compare Mynn with his contemporaries and the poem closes with these lines:
With his tall and stately presence, with his nobly moulded form,
His broad hand was ever open, his brave heart was ever warm;
All were proud of him, all loved him. As the changing seasons pass,
As our champion lies a-sleeping underneath the Kentish grass,
Proudly, sadly will we name him – to forget him were a sin.
Lightly lie the turf upon thee, kind and manly Alfred Mynn!

Les Murray
The Australian poet Les Murray wrote "The Aboriginal Cricketer":
Good-looking young man
in your Crimean shirt
with your willow shield
up, as if to face spears,

you're inside their men's Law,
one church they do obey;
they'll remember you were here.
Keep fending off their casts.

Don't come out of character.
Like you they suspect
idiosyncrasy of witchcraft.
Above all, don't get out

too easily, and have to leave here
where all missiles are just leather
and come from one direction.
Keep it noble. Keep it light.

Others
One of the most famous pieces of nostalgic rose-tinted poems is Vitaï Lampada by Sir Henry Newbolt.
There's a breathless hush in the Close to-night—
Ten to make and the match to win—
A bumping pitch and a blinding light,
An hour to play and the last man in.
And it's not for the sake of the ribboned coat,
Or the selfish hope of a season's fame,
But his Captain's hand on his shoulder smote
"Play up! play up! and play the game!"
 
The sand of the Desert is sodden red,—
Red with the wreck of a square that broke—
The Gatling's jammed and the colonel dead,
And the regiment blind with dust and smoke.
The river of death has brimmed its banks,
And England's far, and Honour a name,
But the voice of a schoolboy rallies the ranks,
"Play up! play up! and play the game!"
 
This is the word that year by year
While in her place the school is set
Every one of her sons must hear,
And none that hears it dare forget.
This they all with a joyful mind
Bear through life like a torch in flame,
And falling fling to the host behind—
"Play up! play up! and play the game!"

The very short "A Cricket Poem" by Harold Pinter encapsulates the mood and nostalgia common to lovers of cricket:
I saw Len Hutton in his prime,
Another time,
another time.

Andrew Lang's cricketing parody of Ralph Waldo Emerson's "Brahma" is memorable:
If the wild bowler thinks he bowls,
Or if the batsman thinks he's bowled,
They know not, poor misguided souls,
They too shall perish unconsoled.
I am the batsman and the bat,
I am the bowler and the ball,
The umpire, the pavilion cat,
The roller, pitch, and stumps, and all.

Roy Harper's song "When an Old Cricketer Leaves the Crease" (1975) is perhaps the best-known cricket lyric in contemporary popular music:
When an old cricketer leaves the crease, you never know whether he's gone,
If sometimes you're catching a fleeting glimpse, of a twelfth man at silly mid-on.
And it could be Geoff, and it could be John,
With a new ball sting in his tail.
And it could be me, and it could be thee,
And it could be the sting in the ale... sting in the ale.

(partial)

Roy Harper also penned a poem for English cricketer Graeme Fowler's benefit event, "Three Hundred Words":
I remember Pat Tetley,
and romping in grass
- that was tall –
at the back of the cricket field,
trying to catch glimpses
of knickers and ass,
whilst over the fence
the crowd yelled, ooh-ed and roared,
as Ramadhin, Weekes and Frank Worrell all scored...

(partial) >

Australian poet Damian Balassone often employs cricket themes, such as in the poem "Strange Dismissal", which appears in Quadrant magazine:
It sounds silly   
but it’s harsh  
to be caught Lillee   
bowled Marsh,  
but that’s what happened to me    
the over prior to tea.

Miscellaneous verses and songs
"The Surrey Poet" on Jack Hobbs
Albert Craig, better known as "The Surrey Poet", was a popular figure at The Oval at the end of the 19th and beginning of the 20th century, hawking his rapidly improvised verses to the crowd. Of Jack Hobbs' County Championship debut he wrote:
Joy reigned in the Pavilion,
And gladness 'mongst his clan
While thousands breathed good wishes round the ring;
Admirers dubbed the youngster
As Surrey's coming man;
In Jack Hobbs' play they saw the genuine ring.
'Twas well worth going to see
Illustrious Hayward's smile,
While Razor Smith and Walter Lees
Cheered with the rank and file.

Victory Calypso
At Lord's in 1950, West Indies defeated England in England for the first time. Egbert Moore, who sang under the pseudonym Lord Beginner, popularized the most famous of cricketing calypsos to celebrate the occasion. He was accompanied by Calypso Rhythm Kings, "supervision" by Denis Preston. It was recorded on the Melodisc (1133) label (MEL 20). The song was originally composed by Lord Kitchener.

"The Victory Calypso" also immortalised the spin bowling pair of Sonny Ramadhin and Alf Valentine. The calypso begins thus:
Cricket lovely Cricket,
At Lord's where I saw it;
Cricket lovely Cricket,
At Lord's where I saw it;
Yardley tried his best
But Goddard won the Test.
They gave the crowd plenty fun;
Second Test and West Indies won.

Chorus:  With those two little pals of mine
Ramadhin and Valentine.

The Ashes (Australia vs MCC 1954–55)
Tyson taught them a lesson that can't be forgotten,
Tyson taught them a lesson that can't be forgotten,
We began quietly, but we came back with victory,
Good captaincy from Len Hutton, but the honours must go to Typhoon Tyson.

Australia's tragedy, it began at Sydney,
Magnificent Tyson, had their batsmen beaten,
He went on to give us, a victory for Christmas,
Good captaincy from Len Hutton, but the honours must go to Typhoon Tyson.

More shocks for Australia, the Melbourne disaster,
As Favell got going, his wicket went tumbling,
We got them out cheaply, and score second victory,
Good captaincy from Len Hutton, but the honours must go to Typhoon Tyson.

The bowling was so good, it remind them of Larwood,
Magnificent Tyson finished with seven for twenty-seven,
They had no excuses, we regained the Ashes,
Good captaincy from Len Hutton, but the honours must go to Typhoon Tyson.

Gavaskar Calypso
Lord Relator (born Willard Harris) wrote the "Gavaskar Calypso" to celebrate Gavaskar's first Test series, in West Indies in 1970–71. This was voted at No. 68 at a "Calypso of the Century" poll (although "Victory Calypso" did not feature in the list).

The most famous part of the "Gavaskar Calypso" is the one that describes how he batted "like a wall":
It was Gavaskar
The real master
Just like a wall
We couldn't out Gavaskar at all
Not at all
You know the West Indies couldn't out Gavaskar at all.

A. E. Housman
Cricket features, albeit briefly, in late-Victorian poet A. E. Housman's most famous collection of somewhat gloomy poems A Shropshire Lad, published in 1896 and never out-of-print since then.  Poem XVII reads:
Twice a week the winter thorough
Here stood I to keep the goal:
Football then was fighting sorrow
For the young man’s soul.

Now in Maytime to the wicket
Out I march with bat and pad:
See the son of grief at cricket
Trying to be glad.

Try I will; no harm in trying:
Wonder 'tis how little mirth
Keeps the bones of man from lying
On the bed of earth.

10cc Dreadlock Holiday
"Dreadlock Holiday" is probably the most well-known pop song to mention cricket. 10cc's hit single reached number 1 in the UK in 1978. However, the song has only a tenuous connection with cricket, mentioning it in the chorus: "I don't like cricket, oh no, I love it".

Duckworth Lewis Method
The group The Duckworth Lewis Method have released two concept albums about cricket, entitled The Duckworth Lewis Method and Sticky Wickets.

Poetry books
 Moments and Thoughts, by John Snow (cricketer) (Kaye & Ward Ltd., 1973)
 A Breathless Hush: The MCC Anthology of Cricket Verse, by Hubert Doggart and David Rayvern Allen (2004)Come Shane, by Victoria Coverdale (Make Jam Press, 2006) . A poetic tribute to Shane Warne from a female admirer and how her world changed when "that" ball was delivered.
 A Tingling Catch: A Century of New Zealand Cricket Poems 1864–2009, edited by Mark Pirie (Wellington, N.Z.: HeadworX Publishers). . First anthology of New Zealand cricket poems.
 Cautionary Tales from the Pavilion: A Short Collection of Verse, by Giscard Drew (2014)
 Hows Its, by Nick Whittock (Inken Publish, 2014). 
 Leg Avant: The New Poetry of Cricket, edited by Richard Parker (Crater Press, 2016)
 Less Cautionary Tales from the Pavilion: A Slightly Longer Collection of Verse, by Gas Card Drew (2020)

See also
Cricket in fiction
Cricket in film and television

References

BibliographyThey Made Cricket by G. D. Martineau (1956), Museum PressThe Penguin Cricketer's Companion'' ed. Alan Ross (1981)

External links
Complete text of "Vitai Lampada"
Frindall column referring to "Victory Calypso"
Lyrics of the "Victory Calypso"
Audio of famous cricket calypsos

Cricket poems
Cricket culture